"King's Cross" is a Pet Shop Boys song, written by Chris Lowe and Neil Tennant, and is a track on their 1987 album Actually. 

In 2007, it was recorded and released as a single by Tracey Thorn.

Pet Shop Boys version and the King's Cross fire
Two months after the release of Actually, 31 people were killed in the King's Cross fire. Lines such as "dead and wounded on either side, you know it's only a matter of time" could be seen as prophetic of the disaster. In reality, the lyric is described by Tennant as "a metaphor for Britain" because "King's Cross is the station you come to when you come down to London looking for opportunity from the Northeast, the most depressed part of England [...] And there's lots of crime around King's Cross - prostitution, drug addicts, and a lot of tramps come up to you there"

Pet Shop Boys' own version of this song remained an album-only track, but The Sun newspaper campaigned for it to be released as a charity single.

The song featured in the 1987 film It Couldn't Happen Here in a scene where a man heads out to work engulfed in flames. Director Jack Bond was going to be delete the scene but it remained after he consulted with families of some of the victims.

Tracey Thorn version

On 9 December 2007, Tracey Thorn released "King's Cross" as the final single from her Out of the Woods album. The single version was remixed by Hot Chip.

Her version of "King's Cross" had first appeared as an iTunes exclusive bonus track to Thorn's album Out of the Woods. This stripped back version had been recorded for inclusion on the main album, but at the time Thorn said in a blog post on Myspace there was not enough room to include it, so it remained a bonus for digital versions of the album only.

Neil Tennant from Pet Shop Boys was also thanked in the sleeve-notes to Out of the Woods as he gave her motivation to record and release a new solo album twenty-five years after her first solo album.

Track listing
Digital download
"King's Cross" (Hot Chip remix) – 6:49

References

1987 songs
2007 singles
Kings Cross, London
Pet Shop Boys songs
Songs about London
Songs written by Neil Tennant
Songs written by Chris Lowe
Tracey Thorn songs